William Arthur Sewell (9 August 1903 – 19 April 1972) was a university professor of English. Arthur Sewell was born in Goole, Yorkshire, England on 9 August 1903. He was appointed to the chair of English at Auckland University College in 1933 and moved to New Zealand. In 1945 he returned to England from Auckland. In 1946 he became the Byron professor of English at the University of Athens. He was then director of the British Institute in Barcelona (1952–53), and professor of English at the University of Ankara (1954–56) and the American University of Beirut (1956–65). He returned to New Zealand in 1965 to become professor of English at the University of Waikato until he retired in 1969. He died in Hamilton on 19 April 1972.

Personal Life 
In 1951 he married Rosemary Seymour. They had one son, William Seymour Sewell.

References

1903 births
1972 deaths
British emigrants to New Zealand
People from Goole
Academic staff of the University of Auckland
Academic staff of the American University of Beirut
Academic staff of the University of Waikato